Kevin Bruce Reed (born May 9, 1955) is an American Presbyterian author, theologian, and publisher.

Reed grew up in Dallas, Texas, and attended the Richardson, Texas public schools. He left Dallas in August 1973, to attend Moody Bible Institute, in Chicago, Illinois, where he graduated with a diploma in Bible and theology in 1976. He later studied at the University of Texas at Dallas, where he graduated with a B.A. in English.

Reed publishes through Presbyterian Heritage Publications, of Dallas.  He has written extensively on Presbyterian worship practices, especially on the regulative principle of worship, which is the belief that the scriptures provide a complete guide for how Christian worship ought to be done, and that things not specifically taught or commanded (such as the use of musical instruments in worship) should be avoided.  Some of his books on worship include Biblical Worship and Biblical Church Government. He has also been instrumental in reprinting classic Reformed authors such as John Knox and Samuel Miller.  Reed worships with the *  East Texas Reformed Fellowship.

Reed's writings and interactions with his work 
 Reed: "Imperious Presbyterianism"
 Reed: "Church Membership in an Age of Idolatry and Confusion"
  Reed on Celebrating Christmas
  Reed: Making Shipwreck of the Faith — Evangelicals and Roman Catholics Together
 Reed: Biblical Worship
 Book Review by Reed, Presbyterian Worship: Old and New — A Review and Commentary upon Worship in Spirit and Truth, a book by John Frame (Phillipsburg, N.J.: Presbyterian and Reformed Pub. Co., 1996; paper, 171 pages) 
 An Essay by Reed on Presbyterian Worship — An Extended Review and Commentary Based upon the Geneva Papers by James Jordan
 Reed on the Decline of American Presbyterianism
 Reed: Presbyterian Government in Extraordinary Times
 Reed: Biblical Church Government
 Reed: True and False Worship
  Interaction with Reed's Monograph Presbyterian Government in Extraordinary Times
 Appendix G in The Covenanted Reformation Defended by Greg Barrow: A brief examination of Mr. Bacon's principles regarding the visible church and the use of private judgment. Also, some observations regarding his ignoble attack upon Kevin Reed in his book entitled The Visible Church in the Outer Darkness

American Presbyterians
American Calvinist and Reformed theologians
People from Dallas
1955 births
Living people
20th-century Calvinist and Reformed theologians
21st-century Calvinist and Reformed theologians